Malcolm Sterling Davis (born October 10, 1956) is a Canadian former professional ice hockey player. Davis played for the Buffalo Sabres of the National Hockey League and its American Hockey League farm team, the Rochester Americans, and later with TPS Turku in Finland.

Born in Lockeport, Nova Scotia, Davis played for the Amherst Ramblers, a junior team in Amherst, Nova Scotia, and then attended Saint Mary's University in Halifax, Nova Scotia where he was a member of the university's Huskies ice hockey team.

Davis won the Les Cunningham Award for 1983–84. The award is given to the American Hockey League's "Most Valuable Player" of the regular season, as voted on by AHL media and players.

Career statistics

External links

Sabres Legends – Mal Davis

1956 births
Adirondack Red Wings players
Buffalo Sabres players
Ice hockey people from Nova Scotia
Kansas City Red Wings players
Living people
People from Shelburne County, Nova Scotia
Rochester Americans players
Saint Mary's University (Halifax) alumni
HC TPS players
Undrafted National Hockey League players
Canadian expatriate ice hockey players in Finland
Canadian ice hockey right wingers